The 1961 Florida State Seminoles football team represented Florida State University in the 1961 NCAA University Division football season. This was Bill Peterson's second year as head coach, and he led the team to a 4–5–1 record.

Schedule

References

Florida State
Florida State Seminoles football seasons
Florida State Seminoles football